Bedum is a railway station located in Bedum, Netherlands. The station was opened on 15 June 1884 and is located on the Groningen–Delfzijl railway. The services are currently operated by Arriva.

Train service
The following services currently call at Bedum:
2x per hour local service (stoptrein) Groningen - Delfzijl

References

External links 
 Bedum station, station information

Transport in Het Hogeland
Railway stations in Groningen (province)
Railway stations opened in 1884